The Hi-Lo Country is a 1998 American Western film directed by Stephen Frears, starring Billy Crudup, Penélope Cruz, Woody Harrelson, Cole Hauser, Sam Elliott, Patricia Arquette, Enrique Castillo, and Katy Jurado. It is set in post-World War II New Mexico and is based on the Western novel by Max Evans.

Plot
Pete Calder sets out one morning, reflecting on his intention to kill someone. As he drives, he thinks back on what led him to this point.

When he was young growing up in the Hi-Lo, New Mexico, Pete met and befriended Big Boy Matson, a cowboy. Soon after becoming best friends, World War II breaks out, and Big Boy decides to volunteer for military service. While Big Boy is away, Pete is given the opportunity to work for corporate cattle baron Jim Ed Love, but declines. He also meets and begins to fall in love with Mona Birk, the wife of Jim Ed's foreman Les Birk, despite also carrying on a relationship with local Josepha O'Neil.

Big Boy returns home from the war, expecting to return to his old life, and finds that half the town is employed by Jim Ed. Hanging on to the mythic ideals of the American West, Big Boy and Pete team up with an old time rancher Hoover Young to raise cattle the cowboy way.

Big Boy has an antagonistic relationship with Jim Ed, and declines offers to be bought out. Things are peaceful for a while, until Big Boy begins an affair with Mona. Out of friendship for Big Boy, Pete resolves to forget his feelings for her, and devotes himself to Josepha. Meanwhile, the tension between Big Boy and Les begins to grow.

As Pete continuously comes into contact with Mona, he becomes more and more obsessed with her. Josepha confronts Pete about his friend's affair and homewrecking, and in the heat of the exchange, Pete reveals his jealousy of Big Boy's relationship. Josepha leaves dejected, and Pete becomes increasingly depressed by both his unrequited feelings and his dishonesty with those he cares about.

Finally Pete confronts Mona and ask her to end the affair for the sake of her and Big Boy's reputation, but Mona counters that she knows he is infatuated with her. Later at a town dance, Les sees Big Boy and Mona dancing and pulls a gun to shoot Big Boy, but has the gun knocked out of his band by a crowd member and is beaten brutally by Big Boy. Mona follows Big Boy outside and kisses him.

Big Boy, Mona, Pete, and Josepha spend the rest of the night together, and after visiting a Mexican witch named Meesa, Pete takes Mona outside and has sex with her, but Big Boy too drunk to notice. Josepha comes out and brings Mona back inside, but does not confront Pete. She later tells Pete to "tell Big Boy before she does, or he'll kill you." Pete reflects on having lost the fear of death. In the end it is Big Boy's younger brother, Little Boy, who ends up impulsively killing Big Boy after a brawl because of feeling humiliated by his older brother.

In the present, Pete sits in his car outside the church holding Big Boy's memorial. After the funeral, he is given a talking to by the Matson boys' mother, who tells him to spare Little Boy, and that she knew since Big Boy was born that his life would end in violence. Pete approaches Little Boy and tells him he is honoring Mrs. Matson's wishes, but that he will kill him if Little Boy ever slanders Big Boy. He walks off with Mona, who is pregnant, who tells him she told Big Boy about their sexual encounter. They say goodbye, and Pete heads off to start a new life in California.

Cast
 Woody Harrelson as Big Boy Matson
 Billy Crudup as Pete Calder
 Patricia Arquette as Mona Birk
 Cole Hauser as Little Boy Matson
 Penélope Cruz as Josepha O'Neil
 Darren Burrows as Billy Harte
 Jacob Vargas as Delfino Mondragon
 James Gammon as Hoover Young
 Lane Smith as Steve Shaw
 Katy Jurado as Meesa
 Sam Elliott as Jim Ed Love
 John Diehl as Les Birk
 Enrique Castillo as Levi Gomez
 Rosaleen Linehan as Mrs. Matson
Other appearances include musician Rose Maddox as Big Boy's Grandmother, rodeo announcer Bob Tallman as himself, and Chris O'Connell, Leon Rausch, Connie Smith, Marty Stuart, & Don Walser as the band.

Reception
The film was regarded by critics and film festivals as an example of the "classic" Western movie genre.

Bob Graham of the San Francisco Chronicle said, "The traditional settings of Westerns are honored: the saloon, the dance hall, the rodeo, the cattle drive, the snowstorm. Hi-Lo is not only the name of the high-country flatlands where the story takes place, it is also a poker game, and that Western cliche is given a good spin, too."

Stephen Holden of The New York Times said, "In its best moments the movie feels like an epic hybrid of Red River and The Last Picture Show."

The score by Carter Burwell, and the Western swing songs of Floyd Tillman, Vaughn Monroe, Eddy Arnold, Merle Travis, Tex Williams, and Hank Williams and sequence performances by Don Walser and Leon Rausch, were well regarded.

Awards
 Winner, Silver Bear for Best Director (Stephen Frears) - 49th Berlin International Film Festival
 Nominated, Golden Bear Award - Berlin International Film Festival
 Nominated, Best Actress (Penélope Cruz) - ALMA Awards
 Nominated, Best Actress (Katy Jurado) - ALMA Awards
 Nominated, Best Supporting Actor (Enrique Castillo) - ALMA Awards
 Winner, Best Breakthrough Performance (Billy Crudup) - National Board of Review
 Winner, Bronze Wrangler Award (Best Motion Picture of the year) - Western Heritage Awards
 Winner, Best Screenplay - Drama (Walon Green) - Western Writers of America

Home media
On December 18, 2012, Shout! Factory rereleased the film on DVD.

References

External links
 
 
 

1998 films
1998 Western (genre) films
American Western (genre) films
1990s English-language films
Films directed by Stephen Frears
Neo-Western films
Films set in New Mexico
Films set in the 1940s
Films produced by Eric Fellner
Films scored by Carter Burwell
Films produced by Tim Bevan
Working Title Films films
PolyGram Filmed Entertainment films
Films shot in New Mexico
Films produced by Martin Scorsese
1998 drama films
1990s American films